"POV" (an acronym for "point of view") is a song by American singer Ariana Grande from her sixth studio album Positions (2020). The song was released to US contemporary hit radio in the United States on March 23, 2021, serving as the album's third single. Grande wrote the song with Tayla Parx and the song's producers Mr. Franks, Oliver "Junior" Frid and Tommy Brown.

Following the release of Positions, "POV" debuted at number 40 on the US Billboard Hot 100, later peaking at number 27. It reached number three on the US Mainstream Top 40, and aided Grande in becoming the first artist to post three concurrent top ten hits in the chart's history. In addition, the song reached top 20 in the charts of Ireland, New Zealand, Puerto Rico Anglo and the United Kingdom, as well as the top ten in Rolling Stone's Top 100 chart.

A dance lyric video for the song, directed by Director X, was released on April 30, 2021 to coincide with the six month anniversary of Positions. A live performance music video of "POV" was released on June 21, 2021.

Background and composition
On October 24, 2020, Grande released the track list of Positions via social media, revealing "POV" as the fourteenth and final track on the album.

"POV" is an R&B ballad with a quiet arrangement accompanied by cello and viola. It has a length of three minutes and twenty-one seconds, and is written with a tempo of 132 beats per minute in the key of E major, while Grande's vocals range from a low note of B3 to a high note of G5. The song opens with rainfall sound effects. On the last line, Grande's voice follows a descending melody as the music fades out.

Lyrically, the song explores the idea of switching places with a lover, and how love can smooth out perceived imperfections. In the track, Grande mentions how deeply her lover, Dalton Gomez, understands her and loves her, how much more understood and adored the singer feels through his eyes, as well as her insecurities, her initial fear of starting a relationship again, and how Gomez has helped her overcome it. She also expresses joy for being accepted for her "ugly", and makes a plea to love herself just as much as her partner loves her.

Critical reception
Jason Lipshutz of Billboard ranked "POV" as his top song from Positions, describing the track as one that "breaks the mold of a traditional R&B ballad", calling it "a breathtaking show-stopper" and "the most elegant–and arguably the flat-out best–deployment of full-on balladry in her catalog to date". He particularly praised the song's lyrical concept, which he regards as an integral part in what makes the song "work so well". Vulture's Justin Curto named the song "one of Grande's best performances on Positions", deeming it "an ecstatic finale presenting her whole range of whistle tones, belts, and runs in just three and a half minutes". Writing for Consequence of Sound, Mary Siroky chose "POV" as one of the three "essential tracks" from the album, and considered it "perhaps the best showcase for the belt listeners often crave from her". Chris DeVille of Stereogum wrote in his review of the album: "Album closer 'POV' is the sort of churchy traditionalist ballad Carey or Whitney Houston once slayed, and Grande proves herself a worthy heir."

Year-end lists
Callie Ahlgrim of Insider ranked "POV" as the 14th best song of 2020, naming it the best ballad in Grande's entire catalog. She praised Grande's "transcendent" vocals, writing that the song "boasts some of her most intimate, impressive lyrics to date". She also commended the song for being "sentimental and expressive without feeling pretentious". In Billboards staff list of the 100 best songs of 2020, "POV" was positioned at 52, with Rania Aniftos commenting that the song "smash[es] the walls [Grande] built up throughout Sweetener and Thank U, Next and "reveal[s] her most beautifully defenseless side yet". NPR ranked "POV" as the 98th best song of 2020, with Nastia Voynovskaya from KQED stating: "Ariana Grande's 'POV' comes off as a fluttering, ethereal ode to newfound love, but it's really a meditation on how she uses romance as a lens to better get to know herself."

Erin Parker of Glamour selected "POV" as one of the 63 best songs of 2020, writing: "I'm always here for an Ari ballad, and 'POV' is such a gorgeous ending to Positions." Natasha Jokic of BuzzFeed picked "POV" as one of the best songs of 2020. Complimenting Grande's "breathtaking" vocals, she stated: POV' gives us a tender insight that's a lot more vulnerable than the rest of Positions might suggest." Karla Rodriguez of Complex ranked "POV" as the 10th best song of 2020. Cahleb Derry of CED Radio named "POV" the sixth best song of 2020, citing a "level of musical and emotional maturity that you cannot fabricate — you simply have to be there to make music like that." Harper's Bazaar named "POV" as one of the best songs of 2020, with Erica Gonzales calling it a "head-over-heels-in-love ballad" and a standout track from Positions. Rachel Epstein of Marie Claire regarded "POV" as one of the best love songs of 2020.

Commercial performance
Following the release of Positions, "POV" debuted at number 40 on the US Billboard Hot 100, becoming the fifth highest charting track from the album that week. "POV" also debuted at number 22 on the Billboard Global 200. As the song sparked an online trend on the video-sharing platform TikTok, it remained stable at number 45 in its second and third week on the Hot 100. Following its launch to US adult contemporary radio, "POV" reached a new peak of number 37 on the Hot 100, in its thirteenth tracking week, on the issue dated June 12, 2021. In its fourteenth tracking week, "POV" declined two spots to number 39, while in its fifteenth tracking week, it rose to a new peak of number 33 on the chart. Following the release of its live music video, "POV" soared to a new peak of number 27 on the Hot 100. It has since charted for a total of 20 non-consecutive weeks.

"POV" entered the top ten of the US Mainstream Top 40 airplay chart at number ten on the issue dated May 15, 2021. It became the third consecutive top ten hit from the parent album Positions and Grande's 19th top ten single. The same week Grande had three songs in the top ten of pop airplay chart, "Positions", "34+35" and "POV" making her the first artist to post three concurrent top ten hits in the survey's history, which started in 1992. Since earning her first top ten hit with "Problem" in June 2014, no other artist has earned as many top ten hits as Grande. The song reached a peak of number three there.

In the United Kingdom, "POV" debuted at number 22, becoming Grande's 29th top 40 entry on the UK Singles Chart. In the following week, it rose to a new peak of 19, becoming Grande's 26th top 20 hit in the UK.

Music video
A music video was expected to be released, but it was scrapped before it was even fully finished. Behind the scenes footage leaked online in 2022 where Grande was seating in a dreamy-looking grass field with a tree beside her.

On January 18, 2022 actor George Todd McLachlan, who played in Euphoria and Shameless, posted a TikTok confirming the music video, showing the shooting schedule of the project. The video shoot took place in Miami, Florida. On January 22, 2023 new images from the music video leaked.

Credits and personnel
Credits adapted from Tidal and the liner notes of Positions.

Personnel

 Ariana Grande – vocals, background vocals, vocal production, vocal arrangement, audio engineering
 Tommy Brown – production
 Mr. Franks – production
 Oliver "Junior" Frid – production
 Tayla Parx – vocal production
 Peter Lee Johnson – strings
 Billy Hickey – audio engineering, mix engineering
 David Campbell – strings arrangement
 Steve Churchyard – strings audio engineering
 Jeff Fitzpatrick – strings audio engineering assistance
 Serban Ghenea – mixing
 Randy Merrill – mastering
 Gerry Hilera – concert mastering, violin
 Mario de Leon – violin
 Ellen Jung – violin
 Ana Landauer – violin
 Phillip Levy – violin
 Lorand Lokuszta – violin
 Michele Richards – violin
 Neil Samples – violin
 Ashoka Thiagarajan – violin
 David Walther – viola
 Rodney Wirtz – viola
 Paula Hochhalter – cello
 Ross Gadsworth – cello

Recording and management
 Recorded at Champagne Therapy Studios (Los Angeles, California)
 Orchestra recorded at Capitol Recording Studios (Los Angeles, California)
 Mixed at MixStar Studios (Virginia Beach, Virginia)
 Mastered at Sterling Sound (New York, New York)

Notes
 Physical releases of Positions credit Grande for "lyrics and melodies".

Charts

Weekly charts

Year-end charts

Certifications

Release history

References

External links
 
 
 

2020s ballads
2020 songs
2021 singles
Ariana Grande songs
Contemporary R&B ballads
Republic Records singles
Song recordings produced by Tommy Brown (record producer)
Songs written by Ariana Grande
Songs written by Tayla Parx
Songs written by Tommy Brown (record producer)